Jesse Rivest (born 1977) is a Canadian singer-songwriter. His main instruments are voice and guitar. As of 2016, he resides in Brazil and previously lived in New Zealand.

Career
In 2005, Jesse Rivest was accepted as a "Best Newcomer Finalist" in the Calgary Folk Music Festival Songwriting Contest for his song "Deadbeat Blues".

In 2007, he was the subject of a 41-minute, nationally-broadcast live interview (and performance) on Radio New Zealand (Jim Mora).

In 2016, an article in the Correio Braziliense revealed that Rivest had been studying music—in Brasília, DF, Brazil—via the bandolim for a year and half. That same year, an article published by Canal RIFF in Brazil further revealed that Rivest had been performing in Brasília.

Discography
 2020: The D.G.B. EP (jesserivest.com release)
 2011: Everyelsewhere EP (jesserivest.com release)
 2010: Live at the Mussel Inn – February 19, 2010 (jesserivest.com release)
 2006: Seventeen Oh-Two Oh-Six (jesserivest.com release)
 1999: The Way Things Were (mp3.com release)

References

External links
 www.jesserivest.com
 

Canadian blues guitarists
Canadian male guitarists
Musicians from Calgary
Musicians from Ontario
Canadian folk guitarists
Canadian singer-songwriters
Living people
1977 births
21st-century Canadian guitarists
21st-century Canadian male singers
Canadian male singer-songwriters